The Asian Carrom Confederation is a Continental body of the Carrom Federations/Associations in Asia. The main aim of the A.C.C. is to promote Carrom in Asia. The A.C.C. coordinates the activities of the Carrom Federations/Associations of the Asian countries.

In July 1991 the International Carrom Federation decided in its 2nd Congress at Male' (Maldives) to establish Continental Confederations. Mr. Zahir Naseer was authorises to contact the Carrom Federations/Associations in Asia and establish an Asian Carrom Confederation.

National affiliates
 Korea Carrom Federation
 Pakistan Carrom Federation
 Carrom Federation of Bangladesh
 Carrom Federation of  Malaysia
 Carrom Association of Maldives
 Japan Carrom Federation
 Carrom Federation of Sri Lanka
 United Arab Emirates Carrom Federation
 Carrom Federation Nepal
 All India Carrom Federation

References

External links

Carrom organisations
Sports governing bodies in Asia